TVB 1898 Stuttgart is a handball club from Waiblingen, town of Bittenfeld, Germany. that plays in the Handball-Bundesliga.

History

TV Bittenfeld played in the 2nd Division German Handball Championship from the 2006/07 season to the 2014/15 season. After finishing third overall in the 2014/15 season, the team advanced to the 1st division German league and changed its name to TVB 1898 Stuttgart. The team's home matches will be played in Scharrena Stuttgart. Due to the limited capacity of the domestic arena, some matches will be held at the nearby Porsche-Arena. Starting in the 2021/22 season, all matches will be in the Porsche Arena. The club has a local rivalry with HBW Balingen-Weilstetten.

Crest, colours, supporters

Club crest

Kits

Sports Hall information

Name: – Porsche-Arena
City: – Stuttgart
Capacity: – 6181
Address: – Mercedesstraße 69, 70372 Stuttgart, Germany

Team

Current squad 

Squad for the 2022–23 season

Technical staff
 Head coach:  Vicente Álamo
 Athletic Trainer:  Steffen Hepperle
 Physiotherapist:  Frank Jakschitz
 Physiotherapist:  Tobias Unfried
 Club doctor:  Dr. Friedel Mauch

Transfers
Transfers for the 2023–24 season

Joining 

Leaving

Previous Squads

Former club members

Notable former players

  Jens Bechtloff (2003–2007)
  Johannes Bitter (2016–2021)
  Kai Häfner (2006–2007)
  Michael Kraus (2016–2019)
  Djibril M’Bengue (2013–2018)
  Jürgen Müller (2006, 2012–2015)
  David Schmidt (2018–2020)
  Manuel Späth (2017–2020)
  Michael Spatz (2015–2016)
  Dominik Weiss (2009–2022)
  Christian Zeitz (2020)
  Patrick Zieker (2019–)
  Teo Čorić (2015–2017)
  Dragan Jerković (2013–2017)
  Robert Markotić (2018–2020)
  Ivan Pešić (2021–2022)
  Jan Větrovec (2006–2008)
  Kasper Kisum (2015–2016)
  Richard Sundberg (2014–2015)
  Rudolf Faluvégi (2019–2021)
  Egon Hanusz (2021–)
  Sajjad Esteki (2015)
  Elvar Ásgeirsson (2019–2021)
  Arnór Þór Gunnarsson (2010–2012)
  Björgvin Páll Gústavsson (2007–2009)
  Viggó Kristjánsson (2020–2022)
  Árni Þór Sigtryggsson (2007–2009)
  Žarko Peševski (2019–2022)
  Bobby Schagen (2016–2019)
  Dennis Szczęsny (2012–2014)
  Viorel Fotache (2015–2017)
  Dragoș Oprea (2016)
  Gregor Lorger (2011–2012)
  Primož Prošt (2020–2022)
  Miljan Vujović (2022–)
  Lukas von Deschwanden (2018–2019)
  Samuel Röthlisberger (2017–)
  Oscar Bergendahl (2022–)
  Patrik Kvalvik (2014–2015)
  Adam Lönn (2019–)
  Tobias Thulin (2021–2022)
  Can Çelebi (2016–2017)
  Yunus Özmusul (2015–2016)

Former coaches

References

External links
 Official website
 

German handball clubs
Handball-Bundesliga
Sport in Stuttgart
Handball clubs established in 1898
1898 establishments in Germany